Marghdari-ye Akarmian Basraha (also Romanized as Marghdārī-ye Ākarmīān Başrahā’) is a village in Neyasar Rural District, Neyasar District, Kashan County, Isfahan Province, Iran. At the 2006 census, its population was 34, in 10 families.

References 

Populated places in Kashan County